This list charts the most successful films at cinemas in Italy by box office sales, in euros and admissions. It also lists the most popular Italian productions in terms of admissions.

Highest-grossing films by box office revenue
The following is a list of the highest-grossing films in Italy. The list is topped by James Cameron's Avatar (2009) which surpassed his Titanic (1997) to take the local record. The highest-grossing Italian film is Quo Vado? (2016) starring Checco Zalone and directed by Gennaro Nunziante. This surpassed their Sole a catinelle (2013) as the top Italian film as well as their What a Beautiful Day (2011), which held the record prior to that. All three are still among the top six. Zalone also directed and starred in Tolo Tolo (2020), currently in fifth place. Prior to these Italian films, the highest-grossing Italian film was Roberto Benigni's Life Is Beautiful (1997). This remains the highest-grossing Italian film worldwide with a gross of over $230 million. Of the current top 15, Titanic has the most admissions with 13.7 million, which ranks 12th all-time in Italy.

Background colour  indicates films currently in cinemas

Most admissions
The following are the films with the most cinema admissions in Italy since 1945. Doctor Zhivago (1966) tops the list with 22.9 million admissions. War and Peace (1956), in fifth place with 15.7 million admissions, is the highest placed Italian production.

Background colour  indicates films currently in cinemas

Most admissions for Italian productions
The following are the Italian films (including co-productions) with the most cinema admissions in Italy since 1950. The leader, War and Peace (1956), is ranked fifth when considering productions from other countries (see above table). Of films listed in the highest-grossing list above, Life Is Beautiful, with 9.7 million admissions, ranks 31st and Quo Vado?, with 9.4 million admissions, 34th.

Background colour  indicates films currently in cinemas

See also 

 Lists of highest-grossing films

References

External links
JP's Box-office Top 250 of all-time in Italy
Ranking of the most watched Italian movies ever in the cinema in Italy

Italy
Cinema of Italy
Italian film-related lists